Uwain may refer to:

 Abd Al Aziz Sayer Uwain Al Shammeri (born 1973), one of the Kuwaiti detainees at Guantanamo Bay
 Sir Uwain, a Knight of the Round Table in Arthurian legend